Giovanni Arduino is the name of:
 Giovanni Arduino (geologist) (1714–1795), known as the “father of Italian Geology”
 Giovanni Arduino (author) (born 1970), Italian writer